Nyctemera giloloensis is a moth of the family Erebidae. It is found on the northern Moluccan Islands Halmahera and Morotai.

The length of the forewings is about 23 mm. The forewings are dark grey-brown, the basal half with white veins and a broad white wingfold, as well as a broad longitudinal line in the cell. The fascia are broad and crossed by suffused veins. The hindwings have a narrow hindmargin. The veins are suffused with brown.

Etymology
The species name refers to the old name for Halmahera, Gilolo, which is also the name for a village on the island.

References

Nyctemerina
Moths described in 2007